In mathematics, an Euler–Cauchy equation, or Cauchy–Euler equation, or simply Euler's equation is a linear homogeneous ordinary differential equation with variable coefficients. It is sometimes referred to as an equidimensional equation. Because of its particularly simple equidimensional structure, the differential equation can be solved explicitly.

The equation
Let  be the nth derivative of the unknown function . Then a Cauchy–Euler equation of order n has the form

Alternatively, the trial solution  may be used to directly solve for the basic solutions.

Second order – solving through trial solution

The most common Cauchy–Euler equation is the second-order equation, appearing in a number of physics and engineering applications, such as when solving Laplace's equation in polar coordinates. The second order Cauchy–Euler equation is

We assume a trial solution 

Differentiating gives  and 

Substituting into the original equation leads to requiring

Rearranging and factoring gives the indicial equation

We then solve for m. There are three particular cases of interest:

 Case 2 of one real repeated root, ;
 Case 3 of complex roots, .

In case 1, the solution is 

In case 2, the solution is 

To get to this solution, the method of reduction of order must be applied after having found one solution .

In case 3, the solution is 

For .

This form of the solution is derived by setting  and using Euler's formula

Second order – solution through change of variables

We operate the variable substitution defined by

Differentiating gives

Substituting  the differential equation becomes

Now let  and  denote the two roots of this polynomial. We analyze the case where there are distinct roots and the case where there is a repeated root:

If the roots are distinct, the general solution is  where the exponentials may be complex.

If the roots are equal, the general solution is 

In both cases, the solution  may be found by setting .

Hence, in the first case,  and in the second case,

Example
Given the equation 

we substitute the simple solution :

Solving the quadratic equation, we get . The general solution is therefore

Difference equation analogue
There is a difference equation analogue to the Cauchy–Euler equation. For a fixed , define the sequence  as

If we do this  times, we find that

where the superscript  denotes applying the difference operator  times. Comparing this to the fact that the -th derivative of  equals

suggests that we can solve the N-th order difference equation

in a similar manner to the differential equation case. Indeed, substituting the trial solution

brings us to the same situation as the differential equation case,

One may now proceed as in the differential equation case, since the general solution of an -th order linear difference equation is also the linear combination of  linearly independent solutions. Applying reduction of order in case of a multiple root  will yield expressions involving a discrete version of ,

()

In cases where fractions become involved, one may use  instead (or simply use it in all cases), which coincides with the definition before for integer .

See also
 Hypergeometric differential equation
 Cauchy–Euler operator

References

Bibliography

Ordinary differential equations